Archibald Macdonald (ca 1787 – 3 March 1872) was a Scottish-born farmer and political figure in Upper Canada. He represented Northumberland in the Legislative Assembly of Upper Canada from 1830 to 1834 as a Conservative.

Born in Callander, Perthshire, he was a captain in the 33rd Regiment of Foot and served during the Napoleonic Wars. Macdonald came to Upper Canada in 1819 and received a land grant near Cobourg. He served as a colonel in the Northumberland militia and was a justice of the peace for the Newcastle District.

Macdonald was a younger brother of Canadian fur trader John MacDonald of Garth, and a brother-in-law of North West Company senior partner William McGillivray, as well as Sir Archibald Campbell, 1st Baronet, one-time Lieutenant-Governor of New Brunswick, Canada.

Archibald Macdonald died on 3 March 1872 and is buried with his wife and two of his daughters in St. Peter's Anglican Church Cemetery in Cobourg, Ontario.

References

Further reading 

Year of birth uncertain
1872 deaths
Members of the Legislative Assembly of Upper Canada
People from Northumberland County, Ontario